Willie and Family might refer to:
Willie Nelson, American country singer and songwriter. 
The Family, Nelson's backing and recording band.
Willie and Family Live, a 1978 live album by Willie Nelson.